{{DISPLAYTITLE:C6H4O3}}
The molecular formula C6H4O3 may refer to:
2,5-Diformylfuran
2,4-Diformylfuran
3,4-Diformylfuran
Monohydroxybenzoquinone
2-Hydroxy-1,4-benzoquinone  
3-Hydroxy-1,2-benzoquinone 
4-Hydroxy-1,2-benzoquinone 
4-Cyclohexene-1,2,3-trione
2,5-Oxepindione
2,7-Oxepindione

See also 
 Hydroxybenzoquinone